Khotlob is a rural locality (a selo) in Nachadinsky Selsoviet, Tlyaratinsky District, Republic of Dagestan, Russia. The population was 151 as of 2010.

Geography 
Khotlob is located 29 km northeast of Tlyarata (the district's administrative centre) by road. Zhazhada is the nearest rural locality.

References 

Rural localities in Tlyaratinsky District